Pier 41 is a ferry terminal on Fisherman's Wharf in San Francisco.  The former headquarters of Blue & Gold Fleet, their box offices are now located at Pier 39.

The Pier is located east of the Fisherman's Wharf district and to the west of Pier 39.  The ferry terminal is close to North Beach, Chinatown, and the Embarcadero.  The area is easily accessible via the historic F Market streetcars.

From Pier 41 you can see Angel Island, Alcatraz, Golden Gate Bridge and Pier 39.

There is service to the Oakland Ferry Terminal, Vallejo Station, the Sausalito Ferry Terminal, and the Ayala Cove Ferry Terminal on Angel Island.

References

External links

Pier 41 Section of Baylink

Ferry terminals in the San Francisco Bay Area
Blue & Gold Fleet
Landmarks in San Francisco
Piers in San Francisco
Fisherman's Wharf, San Francisco